Kalu Rinpoche (1905 – May 10, 1989) was a Buddhist lama,  meditation master, scholar and teacher.  He was one of the first Tibetan masters to teach in the West.

Early life and teachers
Kalu Rinpoche was born in 1905 during the Female Wood Snake year of the Tibetan lunar calendar in the district of Treshö Gang chi Rawa in the Hor region of Kham, Eastern Tibet.

When Kalu Rinpoche was fifteen years old, he was sent to begin his higher studies at the monastery of Palpung, the foremost center of the Karma Kagyu school. He remained there for more than a decade, during which time he mastered the vast body of teaching that forms the philosophical basis of Buddhist practice, and completed two three-year retreats.

At about the age of twenty-five, Rinpoche left Palpung to pursue the life of a solitary yogi in the woods of the Khampa countryside. For nearly fifteen years, he strove to perfect his realization of all aspects of the teachings and he became renowned in the villages and among the nomads as a representative of the Bodhisattva path.

Teaching activity in Tibet

Kalu Rinpoche returned to Palpung to receive final teachings from Drupon Norbu Dondrup, who entrusted him with the rare transmission of the teaching of the Shangpa Kagyu. At the order of Situ Rinpoche, he was appointed Vajra Master of the great meditation hall of Palpung Monastery, where for many years he gave empowerments and teachings.

During the 1940s, Kalu Rinpoche visited central Tibet with the party of Situ Rinpoche, and there he taught extensively. His disciples included the Reting Rinpoche, regent of Tibet during the infancy of the Fourteenth Dalai Lama.

Returning to Kham, Kalu Rinpoche became the abbot of the meditation center associated with Palpung and the meditation teacher of the Sixteenth Gyalwa Karmapa. He remained in that position until the situation in Tibet forced him into exile in India.

In exile
Kalu Rinpoche left Tibet for Bhutan in 1955, before establishing a monastery in Sonada, Darjeeling in 1965. The monastery was near Rumtek, the seat of Rangjung Rigpe Dorje, 16th Karmapa.

In the late 1960s Kalu Rinpoche began to attract Western disciples in India. By the 1970s, he was teaching extensively in the Americas and Europe, and during his three visits to the West he founded teaching centers in over a dozen countries. In France, he established the first retreat center to teach the traditional three-year retreats of the Shangpa and Karma Kagyu lineages to Western students.

Controversy

June Campbell, a former Kagyu nun who is a feminist scholar, acted as Kalu Rinpoche's translator for several years. In her book Traveller in Space: Gender, Identity and Tibetan Buddhism, she writes that she consented to participate in what she realised later was an abusive sexual relationship with him, which he told her was tantric spiritual practice. She raises the same theme in a number of interviews, including one with Tricycle magazine in 1996. Since the book was published she has received "letters from women all over the world with similar and worse experiences" with other gurus.

Second Kalu Rinpoche 
At 3:00 p.m., Wednesday, May 10, 1989, Kalu Rinpoche died at his monastery in Sonada, the Darjeeling District in West Bengal, India. On September 17, 1990, Rinpoche's supposed Tulku was born in Darjeeling, India, to Lama Gyaltsen and his wife Drolkar. Lama Gyaltsen had served since his youth as his secretary.

The former Kalu Rinpoche supposedly chose the vessel for his reincarnation. The Tai Situpa Pema Tönyö Nyinje officially recognized Kalu Rinpoche's yangsi (young reincarnation) on March 25, 1992, explaining that he had received definite signs from Kalu Rinpoche himself. Situ Rinpoche sent a letter of recognition with Lama Gyaltsen to the 14th Dalai Lama, who immediately confirmed the recognition.

On February 28, 1993, Yangsi Kalu Rinpoche was enthroned at Samdrup Tarjayling. The Tai Situpa and Goshir Gyaltsap presided over the ceremony, assisted by Kalu Rinpoche's heart-son, Bokar Tulku Rinpoche. The Tai Situpa performed the hair-cutting ceremony and bestowed on the young tulku the name Karma Ngedön Tenpay Gyaltsen — Victory Banner of the Teachings of the True Meaning. He is now known as the Second Kalu Rinpoche. (In the USA Kagyu organization, Karma Triyana Dharmachakra, recognizes Yangsi Kalu Rinpoche (1990 to present) as the third Kalu Rinpoche; and Kalu Rinpoche is listed as the second Kalu Rinpoche.)

In the fall of 2011, Kalu Yangsi gave a talk at the University of British Columbia in Vancouver. At the end of the talk, a student in the audience asked for his perspective on the sexual abuse and sexualisation of children in the west. Kalu disclosed he was abused, paused then broke down, revealing for the first time that he had been sexually abused at the age of 12 by older monks from the monastery he attended. Shortly after that he posted a video on YouTube so that the story would not become unsubstantiated gossip.

Bibliography
Foundations of Tibetan Buddhism, Snow Lion Publications, 2004, 
Luminous Mind : Fundamentals of Spiritual Practice, Wisdom Publications, 1996, 
Gently Whispered: Oral Teachings by the Very Venerable Kalu Rinpoche, Station Hill Press, 1995, 
Excellent Buddhism: An Exemplary Life, Clearpoint Press, 1995,  
Profound Buddhism: From Hinayana to Vajrayana, Clearpoint Press, 1995, 
Secret Buddhism: Vajrayana Practices, Clearpoint Press, 2002, 
The Dharma: That Illuminates All Beings Like the Light of the Sun and the Moon, State University of New York Press, 1986, 
The Gem Ornament of Manifold Oral Instructions Which Benefits Each and Everyone Appropriately Snow Lion, 1987,

See also
 Buddhism in America
 Salugara Monastery

Notes

References

External links 
 Peer-Reviewed Biography of Kalu Rinpoche on The Treasury of Lives

 When two masters meet Kalu Rinpoche of Tibet and the Korean Zen master Seung Sahn
 International Shangpa Kagyu Network

Monasteries and centers founded by Kalu Rinpoche
 Kagyu Tekchen Choling, Argentina
 Kagyu Pende Gyamtso, Brazil
 Kagyu Kunkhyab Chuling, BC Canada
 Kagyu Thubten Chöling Monastery, Wappingers Falls, NY, USA
 Kagyu Dzamling Kunchab, New York, NY, USA
 Kagyu Droden Kunchab, CA, USA
 Dashang Kagyu Ling, France
 Karma Ling Institute, France
 Centro Milarepa, Italy
 Kagyu Changchub Chuling, Portland, Oregon, USA
 Kagyu Tenjay Choling, Vermont, usa
 Karma Rimay O Sal Ling, Maui, HI, USA
 Dag Shang Kagyu, Spain
 Kagyu Shenpen Kunchab, Santa Fe, NM USA

1905 births
1989 deaths
20th-century lamas
Jamgon Kongtrul incarnations
Lamas from Tibet
Rinpoches
Shangpa Kagyu lamas
Kagyu tulkus